Elvin Hutchison (October 14, 1912 – May 24, 2001) was an American football player and official.

Biography

Early life and education
Elvin Clarence Hutchison was born October 14, 1912, in Guthrie Center, Iowa. He graduated from Red Oak High School in Red Oak, Iowa and went on to Whittier College, where he was known as the "Red Oak Express" on the football team before graduating in 1937. Hutchison later earned a Master's in Education from the University of Southern California in 1948.

Career
Following his collegiate football career, Hutchison played professionally as a halfback for the Detroit Lions in 1939, and as a wingback for the Los Angeles Bulldogs of the Pacific Coast Professional Football League from 1939 to 1946. He coached football at Burbank High School in 1947.

Hutchison officiated in the NFL from 1952 through 1959, and in the American Football League for its entire existence, from 1960 through 1969.

In 1959, Hutchison was named principal of Kaiser Junior High School in Costa Mesa, California.

Marriage and children
Hutchison married Lois Evelyn Walters in May 1943.  They had two daughters, Sandra and Sharon.

Death and afterward
Elvin Hutchison died on May 24, 2001.

Awards
Whittier College Athletic Hall of Fame

References

1912 births
2001 deaths
American football halfbacks
American Football League officials
Detroit Lions players
Whittier Poets football players
People from Guthrie Center, Iowa
People from Red Oak, Iowa
Players of American football from Iowa